Aghbulag or Aknaghbyur is a village in the Khojavend District of Azerbaijan, in the disputed region of Nagorno-Karabakh. The village had an ethnic Armenian-majority population prior to the 2020 Nagorno-Karabakh war, and also had an Armenian majority in 1989.

History 
During the Soviet period, the village was part of the Hadrut District of the Nagorno-Karabakh Autonomous Oblast. After the First Nagorno-Karabakh War, the village was administrated as part of the Hadrut Province of the Republic of Artsakh. The village was captured by Azerbaijan during the 2020 Nagorno-Karabakh war.

Historical heritage sites 
Historical heritage sites in and around the village include an 18th/19th-century cemetery, and the 19th-century church of Surb Astvatsatsin.

Demographics 
The village had 330 inhabitants in 2005, and 322 inhabitants in 2015.

References

External links 
 

Populated places in Khojavend District
Populated places in Hadrut Province
Former Armenian inhabited settlements